Elias Elia may refer to:

 Elias Elia (footballer) (born 1985), Cypriot footballer
 Elias Elia (businessman), Greek Cypriot businessman